Automaton is the eighth studio album by English funk band Jamiroquai, released on 31 March 2017 through Virgin EMI. It is the band's first album in seven years, following Rock Dust Light Star (2010). It was a number-one album in Italy and peaked at number 2 in Switzerland, number 3 in France, and number 4 in the UK.

Background
Jay Kay described the inspiration for Automaton: "in recognition of the rise of artificial intelligence and technology in our world today and how we as humans are beginning to forget the more pleasant, simple and eloquent things in life and in our environment including our relationship with one another as human beings".

Reception

Upon release the album received generally positive reviews. At Metacritic, which assigns a normalised rating out of 100 to reviews from music critics, the album received an average score of 71, which indicates "generally favorable reviews", based on 16 reviews.

In his review for AllMusic, Matt Collar concluded that "There are few bands who play classic disco-funk with as much genuine love for the genre and care in the productions as Kay and Jamiroquai. Ultimately, it's that sense of love and good vibes that drives much of Automaton."

Although not released as a single, "Shake it On" broke into the Official French Singles Chart, peaking at number 154.

Promotion
The album had its worldwide radio premiere on 26 January 2017 at 20:00 GMT on BBC Radio 2's Jo Whiley show, which played its first single, "Automaton".

Singles
On 27 January 2017, Jamiroquai released online a video version of the title track as the album's lead single.

On 10 February 2017, Jamiroquai released an audio version of the track "Cloud 9", and on 22 February 2017 released online the video version featuring actress Monica Cruz.

On 29 June 2017, the band released "Superfresh" as the third official single from the album. An accompanying music video was produced without active participation from front man Jay Kay, whose back injury most likely left him unable to attend the filming. As a result, cut scenes from the "Automaton" video were interspersed throughout it.

In December 2017 a fourth single, "Summer Girl", was released. It was followed by "Nights Out in the Jungle" in January 2018.

Tour
On 17 January 2017, Jamiroquai announced a 10-date festival tour of Asia and Europe due to start on 25 May 2017 in Tokyo, Japan, and to end on 5 August 2017 in Zambujeira do Mar, Portugal; the tour also includes shows in South Korea, Greece, the Netherlands, Italy, Finland, France, Switzerland and Czech Republic.

On 1 February 2017, Jamiroquai announced a new show: on 9 August 2017 at Smukfest, Skanderborg, Denmark.

On 3 February 2017, Jamiroquai announced two new shows, in France and the UK: on 28 March 2017 at the Salle Pleyel, Paris and on 31 March 2017 at the Roundhouse, London. The two shows were sold out in less than one minute.

Jamiroquai also announced they would take part on 12 August 2017 in the Boardmasters Festival, Newquay, Cornwall, United Kingdom.

Track listing

Personnel
Credits adapted from liner notes.

 Jay Kay – vocals
 Matt Johnson – keyboards, engineering, programming
 Paul Turner – bass guitar
 Rob Harris – guitar
 Derrick McKenzie – drums
 Sola Akingbola – percussion
 Joshua Blair – engineering
 John Prestage – engineering assistance
 Mick Guzauski – mixing
 JP Chalbos – mastering

Charts

Weekly charts

Year-end charts

Certifications

References

Notes

External links
 

2017 albums
Jamiroquai albums